The Friedhof Heerstraße cemetery is located at Trakehnerallee 1 (Trakehner avenue No.1), district of Charlottenburg-Wilmersdorf in Berlin, Germany, to the east of the Olympiastadion. It covers an area of 149,650 square meters.

The cemetery was originally named and planned for the local residents of Villenkolonie Heerstraße. It was laid out between 1921 and 1924 around the Sausuhlensee (Sow's wallow lake), so called after wallows the wild boar's used there. Created by landscape architect Erwin Barth as a forest cemetery, the chapel was designed by Erich Blunck.

Today's cemetery does not reflect its original design. In 1935/36 the original plans for extending the cemetery were dropped and the land was appropriated for landscaping related to the 1936 Summer Olympics; the fact that the non-denominational cemetery contained a number of Jewish graves bolstered the Nazis' need to keep the cemetery out of sight. Another problem for the Olympic organizers was that the cemetery chapel could be seen from the sports fields; accordingly the roof was lowered and other changes made to its design. The extension was only delayed and realized immediately after the war in May 1945.
In 1948 the war-damaged chapel was rebuilt following the 1936 design alterations.

From the beginning this cemetery was open to all: Christians, Jews, Muslims, and even suicides. Its idyllic location on the lake attracted many prominent people whose graves are located there.

Graves of prominent people
Those graves marked by an asterisk (*) are Ehrengrab des Landes Berlin (Honoured Grave: the city of Berlin pays all fees)
 Alfred Abel (1879–1937), actor and director
 Conrad Ansorge (1862–1930), composer and pianist
 Jakob Arjouni, (1964–2013), writer
 Hermann Bamberg* (1846–1928), Berlin honorary citizen
 Marcus Behmer* (1879–1958), writer, book illustrator, graphic designer and painter
 Arnold Berliner* (1862–1942), physicist
 Leo Blech (1871–1958), composer and conductor
 Werner Bloch* (1890–1973), politician
 Michael Bohnen (1887–1965), opera singer and actor
 Karl Bonhoeffer* (1868–1948), neurologist, psychiatrist and physician
 Alfred Braun*  (1888–1978), screenwriter, actor and film director
 Ferdinand Bruckner* (1891–1958), writer and theater manager
 Erich Buchholz* (1891–1972), painter
 Horst Buchholz (1933–2003), actor
 Bernhard-Viktor Christoph-Carl "Vicco" von Bülow (1923–2011), better known as Loriot,  humorist, cartoonist, film director, actor and writer
 Paul Cassirer* (1871–1925), art dealer
 Theodor Däubler* (1876–1934), poet
 Alexander Dehms* (1904–1979), politician
 Frida Leider* (1888–1975), opera singer
 Robert Dinesen, (1874–1972), Danish actor and film director
 Günter von Drenkmann*, president of the Court of Appeal
 Bill Drews* (1870–1938), Prussian Minister of the Interior
 Tilla Durieux* (1880–1971), actress
 Fritz Dylong* (1894–1965), politician
 Edyth Edwards* (1899–1956), actress
 Leonore Ehn* (1888–1978), actress
 Alexander Engel (1902–1968), actor
 Erich Fiedler (1901–1981), actor
 Dietrich Fischer-Dieskau (1925–2012), singer, conductor
 Max Jakob Friedländer (1867–1958), art historian
 Gunter Gabriel (1942–2017), singer and composer
 Vadim Glowna (1941–2012), actor
 Curt Goetz* (1888–1960), actor and writer
 Rolf von Goth (1906–1981), actor, writer
 Uwe Gronostay (1939–2008), chorus conductor, composer
 Anneliese Groscurth (1910–1996), physician, German resistance
 Georg Groscurth (1904–1944), physician, German resistance
 George Grosz* (1893–1959), painter
 Käthe Haack (1897–1986), actress
 Thea von Harbou* (1888–1954), screenwriter, novelist, film director and actress
 Maximilian Harden* (1861–1927), journalist and writer
 Alfred Helberger* (1871–1946), painter
 Frieda Hempel (1885–1955), opera singer
 Jo Herbst (1928–1980), comedian
 Klaus Herm (1925–2014), actor
 Hilde Hildebrand (1897–1976), actress
 Paul Höffer (1895–1949), composer
 Walter Höllerer (1922–2003), literature scientist
 Claus Holm (1918–1996), actor
 Arno Holz* (1863–1929), poet and dramatist
 Hermann Jansen* (1869–1945), architect
 Curt Joël (1865–1945), politician
 Karl John, (1905–1977), actor
 Hans Junkermann (1879–1943), actor   
 Margarete Klose (1899–1968), opera singer
 Franz Teddy Kleindin (1914–2007), Jazz musician, composer ("Klarinettenzauber"), arranger
 Georg Kolbe* (1877–1947), sculptor
 Viktor de Kowa* (1904–1973), actor
 August Kraus* (1868–1934), sculptor and painter
 Evelyn Künneke (1921–2001), singer and actress
 Eduard Künneke (1885–1953), composer
 Helmut „Fiffi“ Kronsbein (1914–1991), soccer player and trainer
 Helene Lange* (1848–1930), feminist and politician
 Leopold Langstein* (1876–1933), child physician
 Melvin J. Lasky (1920–2004), American writer, editor
 Valérie von Martens (1894–1986), actress
 Karlheinz Martin* (1886–1948), director of the Hebbel-Theater
 Valérie von Martens (1894–1986), actress
 Günter Meisner (1926–1994), actor
 Hermann Minkowski* (1864–1909), mathematician and physicist
 Oskar Minkowski* (1858–1931), internalist
 Hans Joachim Moser (1889–1967), music scientist
 Hermann Müller (1885–1947), marathon runner and race walker
 Walter Neusel (1907–1964), boxer
 Hildegard Ochse (1935–1997), photographer
 Albert Panschow*, Stadtältester
 Heinz Pehlke (1922–2002), cinematographer
 Josef Pelz von Felinau, writer
 Ernst Pepping (1901–1981), composer
 Werner Peters (1918–1971), actor and film producer
 Werner Pittschau (1902–1928), actor
 Hans-Michael Rehberg (1938–2017), actor
 Günter Rexrodt (1941–2004), politician
 Walter Richter (1905–1985), actor
 Joachim Ringelnatz* (1883–1934), writer, poet
 Ulrich Roski (1944–2003), singer-songwriter
 Willi Rose (1902–1978), actor
 Oscar Sabo (1881–1969), actor
 Hans Sahl (1902–1993), writer
 Oskar Sala (1910–2002), composer
 Hermann Scheer (1944–2010), politician
 Marcellus Schiffer (1892–1932), lyricist
 Heinrich Schnee (1871–1949), lawyer, last Governor of German East Africa
 August Scholtis* (1901–19690), writer
 Gustav Scholz (1930–2000), boxer, better known as Bubi Scholz
 Margarete Schön (1895–1985), actress
 Hannelore Schroth (1922–1987), actress
 Johannes Heinrich Schultz (1894–1970), physician, inventor of autogenic training
 Carl Schuhmann* (1869–1946), sportsman, many medals
 Guido Seeber (1879–1940), cinematographer
 Leonard Steckel* (1901–1971), actor and theatre director
 Ludwig Suthaus (1906–1971), opera singer
 Katharina Szelinski-Singer (1918–2010), sculptor
 Michiko Tanaka (1909–1988), actress, singer
 Sylke Tempel (1963–2017), author and journalist
 Jakob Tiedtke (1875–1960), actor
 Willy Trenk-Trebitsch, (1902–1983), actor
 Dinorah Varsi (1939–2013), pianist
 Walter Volle (1913–2002), rower, gold medal winner Olympia 1936
 Kurt Wegner* (1898–1964), local politician
 Paul Wegener* (1874–1948), actor
 Grethe Weiser* (1903–1970), actress
 Dorothea Wieck (1908–1986), actress
 Agnes Windeck (1888–1975), actress
 Klausjürgen Wussow (1929–2007), actor
 Augusta von Zitzewitz (1880–1960), painter

Gallery

External links 

 Friedhof Heerstrasse 
 Friedhof Heerstrasse Wissenswertes 
 Grabstätten berühmter Persönlichkeiten weltweit 
 Grünanlagen Friedhof Heerstraße 
 Hidden Places: Friedhof Heerstraße
 

Cemeteries in Berlin